Andrew Davidson (born 7 November 1996) is a Scottish rugby union player at the Lock position. He currently plays for Gloucester having previously played for Glasgow Warriors, London Scottish, Newcastle Falcons and Edinburgh Rugby.

Davidson was a product of the Scottish Rugby Academy.

Rugby Union career

Amateur career

Davidson played for Glasgow Hawks when not in use by Glasgow Warriors.

Professional career

Davidson secured an Elite Development Programme place and was aligned to Glasgow Warriors for the 2014–15 season. This meant he could continue playing for Glasgow Hawks whilst training and challenging for a place at the Warriors.

He was named in 2015 as part of the Scottish Rugby Academy structure again aligned to the Glasgow Warriors. He played for Glasgow Hawks.

The lock made his debut for Glasgow Warriors in a pre-season friendly against ASM Clermont Auvergne.

In November 2015 he was loaned to London Scottish by Scottish Rugby Academy, to gain more experience of playing professional rugby.

On 11 May 2016 it was announced that he would be leaving Scottish Rugby Academy to join Newcastle Falcons.

He joined Glasgow Warriors again on 23 August 2018; this time on loan.  The loan deal was made permanent for season 2019-20.

He played for Stirling County in the Super 6 on 16 November 2019. He scored a try.

On 8 June 2020, Davidson signs for local rivals Edinburgh ahead of the 2020-21 season.

He joined Gloucester for the 2021–22 season.

On the 10th of February 2023, Gloucester announced Davidson had left the club and joined Ealing Trailfinders in the RFU Championship with immediate effect.

International career

He was to be capped by Scotland for the under-16s  and under-18s; named in under-19s squad that travelled to Romania  and capped by the under-20s.

References

External links 
 Rugby biography
  Glasgow Warriors biography

1996 births
Living people
Rugby union players from Glasgow
Scottish rugby union players
Glasgow Warriors players
London Scottish F.C. players
Glasgow Hawks players
Newcastle Falcons players
Stirling County RFC players
Edinburgh Rugby players
Gloucester Rugby players
Ealing Trailfinders Rugby Club players
Rugby union locks